The 1998 Prague municipal election was held as part of 1998 Czech municipal elections. Civic Democratic Party has received highest number of votes and formed coalition with Czech Social Democratic Party. Jan Kasl became mayor of Prague.

Campaign
The Civic Democratic Party was led by Mayor Jan Koukal. Party's main rival was Union for Prague UPP) led by Martin Bursík. UPP ran on anti-corruption platform and was attacking Koukal's management of the city. Bursík was attacking Koukal during campaign.

Results

Aftermath
ODS has won the election while UPP was second. Bursík refused coalition with ODS if Koukal leads it. Bursík sought support of ČSSD and KSČM, but Koukal decided to not seek position of Mayor and instead let ODS nominate Jan Kasl. ODS then formed coalition with ČSSD.

References

1998
Prague municipal election
Municipal election, 1998